Connelly v DPP [1964] AC 1254 was a landmark appeal whereby the highest court set out the way in which peripheral double jeopardy trials can take place in British law. It was ruled such proceedings should only be stayed where a retrial would be an abuse of process that violated objective standards of fairness and hampered the rights of the defendant. Connelly had been tried for murder, while in the commission of a robbery, and was found guilty despite a defence revolving around a lack of intent for murder. Connelly then appealed to the Court of Appeal, where his conviction was overturned and he was acquitted of murder for lack of proveable intent to kill or cause serious injury at the moment or leading up to the killing and the indictment reduced to robbery. Connelly pleaded autrefois acquit, or double jeopardy, but the argument was rejected and he was able to be convicted of robbery. It is ruled that offences of murder and robbery differ enough in fact and in law" that charges for both offences must together fall or stand. The moral sphere in which law founded demands in that the public interest (and where a custodial or electronic tagging sentence is imposed, a period of enhanced protection of the public) that robbers do not go without a sentence by way of justice.

Notes

References
 
 

English criminal case law
House of Lords cases
1964 in British law
1964 in case law